The  is a regular edition of an annual Japanese national cup tournament. It started on 1 September 2012 and ended on 1 January 2013 with the final at National Stadium in Tokyo, Japan, won by Kashiwa Reysol 1–0 against Gamba Osaka.

The cup winner will be guaranteed a place in the 2013 AFC Champions League. However, as a requirement of AFC in 2012, the spot is only issued if the team holds a J1 license (but not necessary being a Division 1 team).

Calendar

The collegiate champion no longer qualifies for the Emperor Cup. Though, they may still enter the Emperor Cup if they won the prefectural cup.
The highest ranked Japan Football League (JFL) club after the 17th match day (June 24) is to qualify for the tournament.
December 19 was reserved for at most 1 game of Fourth Round in case of event clashes due to 2012 FIFA Club World Cup. As Sanfrecce Hiroshima, the team playing the Club World Cup was already eliminated in Emperor Cup on Second Round, the event was not postponed.

Participating clubs

Starting in the First Round
Prefectural cup winners – 47 teams

Hokkaidō – Sapporo University
Aomori – Vanraure Hachinohe
Iwate – Grulla Morioka
Miyagi – Sony Sendai
Akita – Blaublitz Akita
Yamagata – 
Fukushima – Fukushima United
Ibaraki – University of Tsukuba
Tochigi – Vertfee Takahara Nasu
Gunma – Tonan Maebashi
Saitama – Heisei International University
Chiba – Kashiwa Reysol U-18
Tokyo – Yokogawa Musashino
Kanagawa – YSCC Yokohama
Yamanashi – Yamanashi Gakuin University Orions
Nagano – Nagano Parceiro
Niigata – Niigata University of Management
Toyama – Toyama Shinjo Club
Ishikawa – Zweigen Kanazawa
Fukui – Saurcos Fukui
Shizuoka – Hamamatsu University
Aichi – FC Kariya
Mie – Suzuka Rampole
Gifu – FC Gifu Second
Shiga – Sagawa Shiga
Kyoto – Amitie SC
Osaka – Kansai University
Hyōgo – Kwansei Gakuin University
Nara – Nara Club
Wakayama – Arterivo Wakayama
Tottori –  
Shimane – 
Okayama – Fagiano Okayama Next
Hiroshima – Fukuyama University
Yamaguchi – Tokuyama University
Kagawa – Kamatamare Sanuki
Tokushima – 
Ehime – FC Imabari
Kochi – Kochi University
Fukuoka – Fukuoka University
Saga – Saga University
Nagasaki –  (*1)
Kumamoto – 
Ōita – Hoyo Oita
Miyazaki – Miyazaki Sangyo-keiei University
Kagoshima – Volca Kagoshima
Okinawa – FC Ryukyu

(*1) The team was the prefectural runners-up; Both Nagasaki Prefectural Cup finalists qualified for the final tournament, after the other finalist, V-Varen Nagasaki, had qualified to the Emperor's Cup as the JFL seeded club.

JFL seeded club – 1 team
V-Varen Nagasaki

Starting in the Second Round
J.League Division 1 – 18 teams

Consadole Sapporo
Vegalta Sendai
Kashima Antlers
Kashiwa Reysol
Omiya Ardija
Urawa Red Diamonds
FC Tokyo
Kawasaki Frontale
Yokohama F. Marinos
Shimizu S-Pulse
Júbilo Iwata
Nagoya Grampus
Albirex Niigata
Cerezo Osaka
Gamba Osaka
Vissel Kobe
Sanfrecce Hiroshima
Sagan Tosu

J.League Division 2 – 22 teams

Montedio Yamagata
Mito HollyHock
Tochigi SC
Thespa Kusatsu
JEF United Chiba
Tokyo Verdy
Machida Zelvia
Yokohama FC
Shonan Bellmare
Ventforet Kofu
Matsumoto Yamaga
Kataller Toyama
FC Gifu
Kyoto Sanga
Fagiano Okayama
Gainare Tottori
Tokushima Vortis
Ehime FC
Giravanz Kitakyushu
Avispa Fukuoka
Roasso Kumamoto
Oita Trinita

Drawing
Since this year, the drawing of the tournament will be held twice: The first draw determine the pairings of first to third round matches; the second draw will be held after the third round that determines the pairings of the fourth round to the final.

Matches

First round

Second round

Third round

Note: The venue was changed on 21 September, originally planned to be Hiroshima Big Arch Main Stadium.

Fourth round

Quarterfinals

Semifinals

Final

References

External links
大会要項｜第91回天皇杯全日本サッカー選手権大会 (Outline of The 92nd Emperor's Cup)

2012 domestic association football cups
2012
2012 in Japanese football
2013 in Japanese football